The city of Bühl (Low Alemannic: Bihl) is part of the district of Rastatt in the southwestern state of Baden-Württemberg, Germany. It has a history reaching back to the twelfth century and was formerly an agricultural town, especially famous for its plums. Bühl has a population of about 29,000, and is in the region between the Rhine Valley and the Black Forest.

Today it is mainly an industrial town, especially in the car manufacturing supply industry. Yet it still has preserved its character and is also renowned for its good restaurants.

Bühl is a town in the southwestern state of Baden-Württemberg, Germany, about  South of Baden-Baden. Bühl is the third largest town in Rastatt County (Landkreis), after Rastatt itself and Gaggenau. Due to its location, size and importance it has become a central place for numerous towns, townships and villages in the neighbourhood. Bühl was proclaimed a major district town (Große Kreisstadt) on 1 January 1973, after it lost its status as an independent county seat during municipal reforms in Baden-Württemberg. Bühl has agreed to form a joint administrative community with the municipality of Ottersweier.

History

Etymology 
The word Bühl is derived from Old German "puhil" and Middle German "buhel", meaning "hill". The three yellow hills on blue ground seen on the coat of arms (already displayed in the court seal of Bühl in 1324) confirm this interpretation. 
To distinguish Bühl from other towns named Bühl, not only in Germany, but other German-speaking countries like Switzerland and Austria, the town used the denominator Bühl (Baden) or Bühl/Baden, clearly identifying Bühl in the Margravate of Baden (Baden) and later in the Grand Duchy and the State of Baden. With the unification of Baden, Hohenzollern and Württemberg in 1952 forming the state of Baden-Württemberg and later the introduction of postal codes there was no need anymore for the denominator Baden. However, it is still used frequently.

Notable people

Alban Stolz (1808–1883), professor of theology 
Ralf Dujmovits (born 1961), mountaineer who climbed all eight thousand-meter mountains
Christian Lusch (born 1981), sport shooter
Stefan Kneer (born 1985), handball player
Herbert Bloch (1907-1987), stamp dealer and expertiser

References

External links 

 Bühl city website
 Websters

Rastatt (district)
Holocaust locations in Germany
Baden